The 1999 Scotland rugby union tour of South Africa was a series of matches played in June–July 1999 in South Africa by Scotland national rugby union team, to prepare the 1999 Rugby World Cup. No Test Matches were played .

Results
'Scores and results list Scotland's points tally first.

References
 

Scotland
tour
Scotland national rugby union team tours
tour
Rugby union tours of South Africa